The Play-offs of the 2015 Fed Cup Americas Zone Group II were the final stages of the Group II Zonal Competition involving teams from the Americas. Using the positions determined in their pools, the twelve teams faced off to determine their placing in the 2015 Fed Cup Americas Zone Group II. The top two teams advanced to Group I for the next year.

Promotion play-off 
The first placed teams of the four pools were drawn in head-to-head rounds. The winners advanced to Group I.

Ecuador vs. Guatemala

Trinidad and Tobago vs. Peru

5th–8th place play-off
The second placed teams of the four pools were drawn in head-to-head rounds to find the equal fifth and sixth placed teams, and the equal seventh to eighth placed teams.

Barbados vs. Puerto Rico

Costa Rica vs. Dominican Republic

9th–12th place play-off
The third placed teams of the four pools were drawn in head-to-head rounds to find the equal ninth and tenth placed teams, and the equal eleventh to twelfth placed teams.

Uruguay vs. Honduras

Bahamas vs. Bermuda

Final placements

  and  advanced to Group I.

See also
 Fed Cup structure

References

External links
 Fed Cup website

2015 Fed Cup Americas Zone